Doctor Love is the second studio album by Italian DJ and music producer Alex Gaudino. The album features a number of well-known artists such as Kelly Rowland, Jordin Sparks, Mario, The Black Eyed Peas's Taboo, and Jay Sean among others. It was released on March 12, 2013.

Background
It is the first LP by Alex Gaudino since the release of his first album, My Destination, back in 2008. Six singles have been released from the album: "I'm in Love (I Wanna Do It)" in 2010, "What a Feeling", featuring Kelly Rowland, in 2011, "I Don't Wanna Dance", featuring Taboo, in 2012, "Playing with My Heart", featuring Canadian singer JRDN, "Is This Love", featuring Jordin Sparks and "Beautiful", featuring Mario, all in 2013, and received positive reviews from critics.

Track listing

Release history

References

2013 albums
Alex Gaudino albums